Charge or charged may refer to:

Arts, entertainment, and media

Films
 Charge, Zero Emissions/Maximum Speed, a 2011 documentary

Music
 Charge (David Ford album)
 Charge (Machel Montano album)
 Charge!!, an album by The Aquabats
 Charged (Nebula album)
 Charged (Toshinori Kondo, Eraldo Bernocchi and Bill Laswell album)

Television
 Charge (TV series)
 Charge! (TV network)
 "Charged" (Reaper), episode 2 of season one of Reaper

Companies
 Charge Automotive Limited, an electric-vehicle manufacturer
 Charged Productions, an animation studio
 Charged Records, a record label

Finance
 Equitable charge, confers a right on the secured party to look to a particular asset in the event of the debtor's default
 Floating charge, a security interest over the assets of a company

Law
 Criminal charge, a formal accusation made before a court by a prosecuting authority
 Legal charge, information or indictment through a formal legal process

Mathematics, science, and technology
 Charge (physics), the susceptibility (state of being affected) of a body to one of the fundamental forces
 Color charge, a property of quarks and gluons, related to their strong interactions
 Electric charge, a property which determines the electromagnetic interaction of subatomic particles
 Magnetic charge, a property of theoretical magnetic monopoles
 Charge, the air and fuel mixture fed into an internal combustion engine
 CHARGE syndrome, a specific set of birth defects in children
 Explosive charge, a measured quantity of explosive material
 Signed, finitely additive measure in mathematics

Military 
 Charge (bugle call)
 Charge (warfare), a military manoeuvre
 Charges (military), ranks used in German-speaking armies

Sports
 Charge (basketball), illegal contact by pushing or moving into another player's torso
 Charge (ice hockey), illegal contact by taking three or more strides or jumping before hitting an opponent
 Charge (fanfare), played at sporting events
 Guangzhou Charge, a Chinese esports team in the Overwatch League

Other uses
 Charge of the Goddess, a text often used in the religion Wicca
 Charge (heraldry), any object depicted on a shield
 Charge (student associations), the executive of German student fraternities
 Charge (youth), an underage person placed in the care of a medieval nobleman
 Charge, a type of pen spinning trick
 , two classes of diplomatic agents
 Pastoral charge, a group of congregants in some Protestant churches

See also
 Charger (disambiguation)
 Supercharge (disambiguation)